Edmundo Prati (17 April 1889, in Paysandú – 24 November 1970) was a Uruguayan sculptor.

Selected works

 Monument to the Uruguayan national hero José Gervasio Artigas, Plaza Artigas, Salto.
 Monument to the Argentine national hero José de San Martín, Plaza Soldados Orientales de San Martín, Montevideo (with Antonio Pena).
 Monument to the last Charrúa aboriginal people, parque Prado, Montevideo (with Gervasio Furest and Enrique Lussich).
 Monument to the lawyer and politician Luis Alberto de Herrera, Montevideo (with V. Habegger and Jorge Durán Mattos).
 Monument to Franklin Delano Roosevelt, Parque Batlle, Montevideo.
 Monumental statue to José Irureta Goyena, Pocitos, Montevideo.
 Monumental statue The Sawer, Paysandú.
 Monumental statue to Giuseppe Garibaldi, Dolores.

References

External links 

1889 births
1970 deaths
Uruguayan people of Italian descent
People from Paysandú
Uruguayan sculptors
Male sculptors
20th-century sculptors
Uruguayan male artists